The city of Taddua(Tadduensis) was an ancient town of the Roman Empire located in the Roman province of Africa Proconsular.  Today the exact location of the town is uncertain but it is in Tunisia.

In antiquity Taddua  was also the seat of a historic diocese of the Roman Catholic Church, a suffragan of the metropolis of Carthage.    The titular bishopric was recreated in name  in 1989 when it was made a titular bishopric of  the Roman Catholic Church.  Since 2004  Jan Zajac of Kraków has been Bishop of Tadduy.

References

Roman towns and cities in Africa (Roman province)
Catholic titular sees in Africa